The , or , is a transportation company that provides transportation services over a wide range of southeastern and central Aomori Prefecture, Japan. The company used to operate the Towada Kankō Electric Railway Line, which connects Misawa Station in the city of Misawa and Towadashi Station in the city of Towada. The line ceased service on April 1, 2012. The company now operates an extensive bus network, and through subsidiary operations, a taxi service, resort hotels and excursion boats on Lake Towada. It is headquartered in the city of Towada.

History
It received its permit to start commercial transportation operations in 1917, and began operations using automobiles to connect Furumaki (present day Misawa) with Sanbongi (present day Towada). The rail line connecting Furumaki with Sanbongi was opened on September 4, 1922. Transit bus operations commenced from August 1926. The company expanded through purchase of smaller regional bus companies through September 1941. However, during World War II, the Land-Transportation Law reorganizes regional transportation businesses, and the government restricted the assets and operations of the Towada Railway to within the borders of Kamikita District, with the remainder given to the now-defunct Nanbu Railway Company.

After World War II, restrictions were lifted, and in 1951 the railway was electrified, and its gauge widened from 762 to 1067 mm. The company assumed its present name on December 30, 1951. From 1954, the company expanded into the organized tour market, and began operating sightseeing excursion boat services on Lake Towada from September 1954. The 1968 Tokachi-oki earthquake caused severe damage to the company’s assets, and it came under the aegis of the Kokusai Kōgyō Company from October 1969. On October 28, 1985, the new Towadashi Station station building was opened; the new building containing a Daiei department store as well as the company headquarters. Rail operations past the Misawa terminus to Hachinohe Station began from December 1, 2002.

Rail operations
The Towada Kankō Electric Railway Line was a (Class 1 Railroad Operator), operating eleven stations over a   route connecting Misawa with Towada. The company ceased railway services on April 1, 2012.

Bus operations
The company operates city buses in Hachinohe, Misawa and Towada, as well as an extensive regional bus network, serving the rural communities of Kamikita and Sannohe Districts of eastern Aomori. In addition to local services within Aomori Prefecture, the company operates Sirius overnight highway bus service from Towada and Hachinohe to Ikebukuro in Tokyo, and Bluestar overnight service from Towada via Aomori to Ikebukuro and Shibuya in Tokyo. Daytime Umineko service connect Hachinohe and Sendai in Miyagi Prefecture, and Blue City service, Aomori and Sendai. Towada Kankō also operates tour bus services from Misawa and Hachinohe to the Towada-Hachimantai National Park.

Boat operations
The  operates on two routes during non-winter months on Lake Towada, within the Towada-Hachimantai National Park.

Other subsidiaries
A subsidiary company,  operates a fleet of taxis within the city of Towada. Another subsidiary operates a hotel and a ski resort operation at MAkado Onsen.
The company also formerly had a supermarket subsidiary, a store located at Misawa Station, but withdrew from this venture in 2009.

References
 Harris, Ken and Clarke, Jackie. Jane's World Railways 2008-2009. Jane's Information Group (2008).

External links
 official home page

Railway companies of Japan
Companies based in Aomori Prefecture